Colonial Council elections were held in French Cochinchina on 16 April 1939.

Electoral system
The 24 members of the Colonial Council consisted of ten members elected by French citizens, ten by Vietnamese who were classed as French subjects, two by the Chamber of Commerce and two by the Chamber of Agriculture.

Results
Amongst the Vietnamese electorate, three Trotskyist candidates Tạ Thu Thâu, Tran Van Thach and Phan Văn Hùm received around 80% of the vote; the pro-French Constitutionalist Party received 15% and Stalinists candidates 1%.

Aftermath
The defeat of the Stalinism led to the Indochinese Communist Party splitting, with Duong Bach Mai continuing to lead the official faction of the party and Nguyen Van Tao heading a breakaway.

References

1939 in Vietnam
1939
1939 elections in Asia